Following is a list of mayors of Seaside, California.

References

Seaside